{{DISPLAYTITLE:C7H7NO3}}
The molecular formula C7H7NO3 may refer to:

 Aminosalicylic acids
 4-Aminosalicylic acid
 Mesalazine
 3-Hydroxyanthranilic acid
 o-Nitroanisole
 3-Nitrobenzyl alcohol
 Salicylhydroxamic acid